On 22 September 1980, the Iraqi Air Force launched a surprise airstrike on Iran, marking the beginning of the Iran–Iraq War.

Background 
Impressed by the Israeli Operation Focus during the Six-Day War, Iraqi President Saddam Hussein ordered his generals to prepare a pre-emptive strike on Iran's Air Force, despite the Iraqi Air Force's shortcomings.

Operation 
At noon time, 192 Iraqi aircraft took off from various airbases across Iraq and headed east towards Iran. The first planes to reach their targets were Su-20s from Kirkuk. The aircraft bombed the Hamadan Airbase at 1:45 PM, causing some damage to the runway and immediately turning back to avoid being shot down. Within the next few minutes other Iraqi aircraft reached their targets located at Tabriz, Dezful, Bushehr, Kermanshah, Ahwaz and Sanandaj but failed to cause a significant amount of damage. At 2:20 pm, five Iraqi Tu-22 bombers flew over the Iranian capital Tehran at very low altitude and bombed the Mehrabad International Airport and the air force command's barracks, although the latter missed its target. At 2:30 pm, four Tu-16 heavy bombers reached Isfahan airbase, which housed half of the Iranian F-14 fleet. The aircraft released their bombs but failed in destroying the runway. At 2:40 pm the last four Tu-22s reached the Shiraz Air base, which housed the other half of the Iranian F-14s. The bombers targeted the runway and a fuel depot but failed to destroy any aircraft.

At the day's end, the results of 250 missions flown were slim, only four enemy planes were  destroyed versus five planes lost. The Iranian Air Force came out of this operation, which was designed to permanently ground it, unharmed. Most of the craters left by Iraqi bombs were filled during the night. By morning, the principal Iranian air bases were operational again.

See also 
Operation Revenge
Operation Kaman 99

References 

Military operations of the Iran–Iraq War in 1980
Airstrikes during the Iran–Iraq War
1980 in aviation
September 1980 events in Asia